Marcela Fabiana Richezza (born December 23, 1964) is a retired female field hockey player from Argentina. She was a member of the Women's National Team that finished in seventh place at the 1988 Summer Olympics in Seoul, South Korea after having won the gold medal the previous year at the Pan American Games in Indianapolis.

References 
  sports-reference
  santafedeportivo

External links
 

1964 births
Living people
Las Leonas players
Argentine female field hockey players
Field hockey players at the 1988 Summer Olympics
Olympic field hockey players of Argentina
Pan American Games gold medalists for Argentina
Pan American Games medalists in field hockey
Field hockey players at the 1987 Pan American Games
Field hockey players at the 1991 Pan American Games
Medalists at the 1987 Pan American Games
Medalists at the 1991 Pan American Games